Lee Sheng-mu (born 3 October 1986) is a Taiwanese badminton player from the Taiwan Cooperative Bank club. He competed at the 2010 and 2014 Asian Games, and the 2012 and 2016 Summer Olympics.

Career 
Lee Sheng-mu's elite career began in the 2009 badminton season when he reached the semifinals of the 2009 Korea Open Super Series in the men's doubles with Fang Chieh-min. The pair continued their success in 2010 with victories at the 2010 Singapore Super Series and the 2010 Indonesia Super Series. He and Fang reached the quarterfinals of the 2012 London Olympics losing to Mathias Boe and Carsten Mogensen of Denmark. After the 2012 Olympics, Lee stopped playing with Fang Chieh-min, partnering with Tsai Chia-hsin instead. Together they reached a top ranking of 3rd, after reaching the finals of the 2014 Australian Open and 2014 Singapore Open. They were consistent semi-finalists and quarter-finalists at various Super Series Events. Together they represented Chinese Taipei in the 2016 Rio Olympics, where they failed to progress out of the group stage. Lee is also partnered with Chien Yu-chin in mixed doubles. Their top result came in 2010 when they reached the semifinals of the 2010 Paris World Championships and won the bronze medal.

Achievements

BWF World Championships 
Mixed doubles

Asian Championships 
Men's doubles

East Asian Games 
Men's doubles

Mixed doubles

Summer Universiade 
Men's doubles

Mixed doubles

World Junior Championships 
Mixed doubles

BWF World Tour 
The BWF World Tour, which was announced on 19 March 2017 and implemented in 2018, is a series of elite badminton tournaments sanctioned by the Badminton World Federation (BWF). The BWF World Tour is divided into levels of World Tour Finals, Super 1000, Super 750, Super 500, Super 300 (part of the HSBC World Tour), and the BWF Tour Super 100.

Men's doubles

BWF Superseries 
The BWF Superseries, which was launched on 14 December 2006 and implemented in 2007, was a series of elite badminton tournaments, sanctioned by the Badminton World Federation (BWF). BWF Superseries levels were Superseries and Superseries Premier. A season of Superseries consisted of twelve tournaments around the world that had been introduced since 2011. Successful players were invited to the Superseries Finals, which were held at the end of each year.

Men's doubles

  BWF Superseries Finals tournament
  BWF Superseries Premier tournament
  BWF Superseries tournament

BWF Grand Prix 
The BWF Grand Prix had two levels, the Grand Prix and Grand Prix Gold. It was a series of badminton tournaments sanctioned by the Badminton World Federation (BWF) and played between 2007 and 2017.

Men's doubles

Mixed doubles

  BWF Grand Prix Gold tournament
  BWF Grand Prix tournament

Record against selected opponents 
Men's doubles results with Fang Chieh-min against Super Series finalists, Worlds Semi-finalists, and Olympic quarterfinalists.

  Ross Smith & Glenn Warfe 3–1
  Cai Yun & Fu Haifeng 0–6
  Guo Zhendong & Xu Chen 0–2
  Chai Biao & Guo Zhendong 0–2
  Mathias Boe & Carsten Mogensen 3–4
  Lars Påske & Jonas Rasmussen 0–1
  Anthony Clark & Nathan Robertson 1–1
  Alvent Yulianto Chandra & Hendra Aprida Gunawan 1–1
  Markis Kido & Hendra Setiawan 4–7
  Mohammad Ahsan & Bona Septano 2–3
  Keita Masuda & Tadashi Ohtsuka 0–3
  Hirokatsu Hashimoto & Noriyasu Hirata 6–2
  Cho Gun-woo & Kwon Yi-goo 1–2
  Ko Sung-hyun & Yoo Yeon-seong 1–3
  Lee Jae-jin & Hwang Ji-man 1–0
  Jung Jae-sung & Lee Yong-dae 0–3
  Cho Gun-woo & Shin Baek-cheol 2–0
  Gan Teik Chai & Tan Bin Shen 2–1
  Mohd Zakry Abdul Latif & Mohd Fairuzizuan Mohd Tazari 1–0
  Choong Tan Fook & Lee Wan Wah 2–2
  Koo Kien Keat & Tan Boon Heong 1–1
  Michal Logosz & Robert Mateusiak 0–1
  Songphon Anugritayawon & Sudket Prapakamol 1–0
  Bodin Isara & Maneepong Jongjit 2–0
  Howard Bach & Tony Gunawan 2–2

References

External links 
 
 

1986 births
Living people
Sportspeople from Taipei
Taiwanese male badminton players
Badminton players at the 2012 Summer Olympics
Badminton players at the 2016 Summer Olympics
Olympic badminton players of Taiwan
Badminton players at the 2010 Asian Games
Badminton players at the 2014 Asian Games
Asian Games bronze medalists for Chinese Taipei
Asian Games medalists in badminton
Universiade medalists in badminton
Medalists at the 2014 Asian Games
Universiade silver medalists for Chinese Taipei
Universiade bronze medalists for Chinese Taipei
Medalists at the 2007 Summer Universiade
Medalists at the 2011 Summer Universiade